All in Time is a 2015 romantic comedy film released domestically through Distribber and internationally through TomCat Films. The film marks the feature writing, producing and directorial collaboration of Marina Donahue, along with her producing/writing/directing partner Chris Fetchko. Aside from the film title referring to the passage of time, it is also a twist in the film. Stars include Lynn Cohen, Vanessa Ray and Jean-Luc Bilodeau.

Premise 
The film tells the story of a young couple named Charlie and Rachel, an intern (Clark) and their elderly neighbor, Mrs. Joshman. Music is treated like a character in this film. Elements of time travel are explored, as well as philosophical platitudes such as 'following your dream' and taking 'detours' in your life to see where they lead you. The film is a mix of drama, comedy, music and sci-fi.

Cast 
 Sean Modica as Charlie
 Lynn Cohen as Mrs. Joshnman
 Jean-Luc Bilodeau as Clark
 Vanessa Ray as Rachel
 Josh Burrow as Glen
 Jay Klaitz as Sam
 Tom Wopat as Dentist
 Pritesh Shah as Sameer
 Rob Bartlett as Rick
 Fred Norris as Rusty
 Connie Shelhamer as Lane
 Laura Shay as Laura
 Pete Palladino as Tracey
 Ron Simasek as Mark
 Rachel Donahue as Devon

Production 

Chris Fetchko was the manager for the rock group The Badlees and wrote a story based on his experience with Marina Donahue of Corner Bar Pictures. The collaboration led to the indie film winning numerous film festivals and premiering in New York with host Peter Travers of the New York Film Critics Series and Rolling Stone. All In Time was the debut feature film for Corner Bar Pictures.

Production company 
Corner Bar Pictures is an independent production company which deals with all project types from animation to feature-length films. Their emphasis is on projects in which the company is involved very early - typically at the writing phase - and extends through post-production. All in Time, a low-budget independent film, is their debut and won 12 festival awards prior to its release on the film festival circuit.

The director of photography, David M. Dunlap, shot the movie with two Arri Alexa digital cameras. Dunlap's other credits include Gossip Girl, House of Cards, and Shaun of the Dead.

References

Additional sources 

New Jersey Film Festival - All in Time, 2015 
Time Leader, 2015 
PA Homepage News 
Vanessa Ray talks about the film 
Up Close, by Alan Stout (2016) 
Citizens Voice (News article)  
KRZ Radio Interview 
Broadway World 
Lynn Cohen at La Costa 
Long Beach Film Festival

External links
 
 

2015 films
American romantic comedy films
2010s English-language films
2010s American films